Ziyang District is one of two districts in Yiyang City, Hunan Province, China. The district is located on the northern bank of Zi River and on the southern bank of the Dongting Lake. It is bordered to the north by Yuanjiang City and Hanshou County, to the west by Taojiang County, to the south by Heshan District, to the east by Xiangyin County.

The district has two subdistricts, five towns and a township under its jurisdiction. The government seat is Damatou Subdistrict.

Administrative divisions
After an adjustment of subdistrict divisions of Ziyang District in December 2005, Ziyang District has two subdistricts, five towns and a township under its jurisdiction.

2 Subdistricts
 Damatou
 Qichelu

5 Towns
 Changchun, Hunan
 Cihukou
 Shaotou
 Xinqiaohe
 Yingfengqiao

1 Township
 Zhangjiasai

References

www.xzqh.org

External links 

 
County-level divisions of Hunan
Districts of Yiyang